Palma del Río is a handball team based in Palma del Río, Córdoba province, Andalusia. It was founded in 1973 within Salesians school of Palma del Río.

Season by season

1 season in Liga ASOBAL
8 seasons in División de Plata

Notable players
 Rafael Baena
 Nikola Dokić

Stadium information
Name: - El Pandero
City: - Palma del Río
Capacity: - 1,500 seats
Address: - Avenida Aulio Cornelio Palma, s/n

References

External links
Official website

Sports teams in Andalusia
Spanish handball clubs
Handball clubs established in 1973
Province of Córdoba (Spain)